Nafiye Ceylanyar Hanım ("precious" and "gazelle"; 1830 - 27 December 1855) was a consort of Sultan Abdulmejid I of the Ottoman Empire.

She was of Circassian origins and was born in Sochi. Her real name was Nafiye Hanim. She was tall, with long golden hair. Having been presented in the imperial harem by Adile Sultan, Ceylanyar married Abdulmejid in 1851, that he had fallen in love with her after seeing her dance. Her family received land and income. She was given the title of "Fifth Ikbal". On 31 March 1852, she gave birth to her only child, a son, Şehzade Mehmed Rüşdi in the Old Çırağan Palace. The prince died at the age of nine months. The same year, she was elevated to the title of "Fourth Ikbal".

In early 1853, she was elevated to the title of "Third Ikbal", and in 1854, she was elevated to the title of "Second Ikbal". She died of tuberculosis in the Feriye Palace, on 27 December 1855, and was buried in the mausoleum of Gülistü Kadin, Fatih Mosque, Istanbul.

Issue

In literature
Ceylanyar is a character in Hıfzı Topuz's historical novel Abdülmecit: İmparatorluk Çökerken Sarayda 22 Yıl: Roman (2009).

See also
Ikbal (title)
Ottoman Imperial Harem
List of consorts of the Ottoman sultans

References

Sources

1830 births
1856 deaths
19th-century people from the Ottoman Empire
People from the Ottoman Empire of Circassian descent
Ottoman Sunni Muslims
Consorts of Abdulmejid I